The M1943 Mortar or 120-PM-43 or the 120-mm mortar Model 1943, also known as the SAMOVAR, is a Soviet 120 millimeter calibre smoothbore mortar first introduced in 1943 as a modified version of the M1938 mortar. It virtually replaced the M1938 as the standard weapon for mortar batteries in all Soviet infantry battalions by the late 1980s, though the armies of the Warsaw Pact utilised both in their forces.

Design 
This muzzle-loading mortar can be easily broken down into three parts – barrel, bipod and baseplate – for movement over short distances or towed by a GAZ-66 truck on a two-wheel tubular carriage. The baseplate mounting permits all-azimuth firing, however as with most Soviet mortars it was difficult to turn rapidly over a wide traverse. It could accommodate small-angle shifts of up to 6 degrees without having to shift the baseplate though.

Variants 
It was copied in China as the Type 53 mortar. A more robust but heavier version, the Type 55, was developed by Norinco.
Egypt also produced a locally modified variant, the Helwan Model UK 2.
An improved version called the 2B11 Sani was also produced by the Soviets and, in combination with the 2B9 Vasilek, was being used to phase out the M1943 from service.

Users 

 
 
 
 : Type 53 variant
 : 6
 : 12
 
 : 6
 : 12 in store
 : Manufactured as Type 53 and Type 55
 : 28
 
 
 : PM-43 and Helwan Model UK 2
 
 : 8
 : 18
 : 1 
 
 
 
 
 
 : 8
 : 12
 : Type 53 variant
 
 : 24
 : Type 53 variant
 
 
 
 : Type 55
 
 
 
 : Type 53 variant
 : PM-43, Type 53 and Type 55
 : 6

Former users 
 
 Liberation Tigers of Tamil Eelam

References

External links
 M-43 120 mm mortar (Russian Federation), Mortars – Jane's Infantry Weapons

World War II infantry mortars of the Soviet Union
Cold War artillery of the Soviet Union
120mm mortars
Weapons and ammunition introduced in 1943